The Markandeya Purana is a Sanskrit text of Hinduism, and one of the eighteen major Puranas. The text's title Markandeya refers to a sage in Hindu History, who is the central character in two legends, one linked to Shiva and other to Vishnu. The Markandeya text is one of the Puranas that lacks a sectarian presentation of ideas in favor of any particular god, and it is rare to read any deity being invoked or deity prayers in the entire text.

The Markandeya Purana is probably one of the oldest in Purana genre of Hindu Literature, among the most interesting and important, states Ludo Rocher. It is famous for including the Devi Mahatmya within it, the oldest known treatise on Devi (Goddess) as the Supreme Truth and Creator Of The Universe. The text is considered as a central text of the Hindu Goddess-related Shaktism tradition, with an extraordinary expression of reverence for the feminine. The Markandeya Purana's Devi Mahatmya is often ranked in some Hindu traditions to be as important as the Bhagavad Gita.

The extant manuscripts of this Purana have 137 chapters, of which chapters 81 through 93 is the Devi Mahatmya. Tradition and some medieval era texts assert that the Markandeya Purana has 9,000 verses, but surviving Manuscripts have about 6,900 verses. 2,100 verses were transferred to Devi Bhagavatam. The text presents a diverse range of topics, with socio-cultural information and symbolism for Vedic ideas and Metaphysical Thought.

History 

The Markandeya text is probably one of the oldest Puranas in Hinduism. The text's literary style and content, wherein the early chapters read like a supplement to the Hindu epic Mahabharata has led scholars to suggest it is an early composition that likely followed the epic. 

Other scholars have also suggested that parts of this Purana existed by the third century. In contrast, Nileshvari Desai suggests that the oldest of extant manuscripts probably is from the 7th-century CE. The earliest version of the Makandeya Purana, with Devi Mahatmya, was probably composed near the Narmada river, in Western India.

The text has also been dated with the help of epigraphical evidence. The Dadhimati Mata inscription, for example has been dated to be from 608 CE, and this inscription is a quote from chapter 10 of the Devi Mahatmya (91st chapter of the Purana). This suggests that this part of the text existed by the 6th century CE. A complete Palm-leaf manuscript of the text was discovered in Nepal, and has been dated to 998 CE. Similarly, the early 8th-century text Malatimadhava of Bhavabhuti references Devi Mahatmya, which implies the text was established and in circulation by then. Other scholars have placed it between 4th- to 6th-century CE. The idea of Goddess as the supreme, states John Lochtefeld, likely existed before the 6th-century than the composition date of Devi Mahatmya, because it appears in so fully developed form in the text.

Like all the Puranas, the Markandeya Purana, has a complicated chronology. Dimmitt and van Buitenen state that each of the Puranas is encyclopedic in style, and it is difficult to ascertain when, where, why and by whom these were written:

Printed editions 
The three early printed editions of this text vary from one another. The Calcutta edition ends abruptly in chapter 136, leaving the narrative of Dama halfway. The Bombay and Poona editions have complete narrative of Dama, which ends in chapter 137.

The text has been translated into English by many, including C. C. Mukherjee (1893) and F. E. Pargiter. However, states Coburn, Pargiter's focus was reconstruction of India's political history, not other contents of the Purana. Pargiter's work and conclusions have been widely disputed, after he published his translation in 1904.

A good translation of the Devi Mahatmya text within the Markandeya Purana, states Gregory Bailey, was published in 1991 by Thomas Coburn.

Critical edition 
The Critical Edition of the Mārkaṇḍeyapurāṇam, edited by M. L. Wadekar, 2 vols., Vadodara: Oriental Institute, 2011 (vol. 2, adhyāyas 76-88, is the Devīmāhātmyam).

Content 
This Purana has 137 chapters, of which chapters 81 through 93 is the Devi Mahatmya. The text opens with the Mimamsa founder Jaimini asking sage Markandeya for answers to some questions raised by the Mahabharata, but never addressed in it. Markandeya asserts that he needs to go and perform some Vedic rituals, and suggests Jaimini to meet up with four wise birds who live in the Vindhya range. Jaimini meets the birds. The birds answer his questions, which constitute chapters 4 to 45 of the Markandeya Purana. This discussion weaves in moral instructions with mythology, the theory of Karma, Samsara, Dharma and Shraddha verses from texts such as the Mahabharata and the Gautama Dharmasutras.

The text presents its Yoga philosophy in chapters 39 to 43, and asserts that it is the path to gain self-knowledge and liberation (Moksha), thereby overcoming past Karma. The Yoga discussions, Dattatreya's portrayal and his yoga-teachings within the Markandeya Purana, states Rigopoulos, are essentially those of Jnana yoga, and this emphasis on Jnana within a nondual (Advaita Vedanta) framework characterizes Dattatreya throughout the text. More generally, the Markandeya Purana, along with Vishnu, Vayu, Narada and Kurma Puranas, states Sahasrabudhe, have "unmistakingly the Advaita" (non-dualistic) premises, which likely reflect the Advaita tradition before the times of Adi Shankara.

The later chapters also present a conversation between the birds and sage Markandeya, but the sage is the primary speaker in chapters 45-80 and 94-137. This switch in style, state scholars, is likely because this part is the older core of the Purana. This part consists of genealogy, manvantaras, geography and chapters glorifying god Surya (Sun god).

Devi Mahatmya 

The Devi Mahatmya, literally "glorification or praises of the Goddess", constitutes chapters 81 to 93 of the Markandeya Purana. It is the primary bhakti text of those who revere Durga or Chandi as the Shakti. This text is studied on its own, and sometimes titled as Saptasati or Chandi-mahatmya or Chandipatha. It is particularly popular in eastern states of India, such as West Bengal and Odisha.

The Devi Mahatmya opens with the legend of King Suratha, who was defeated in battle & exiled, and Samadhi, a merchant who was driven away by his wives & children for his wealth. Once, they meet in the forest. Nevertheless, asserts the text, the two discover that they both care about the welfare of those who drove them out. They wonder why they still care. They meet sage Medhas (Sumedha) for answers. The sage replies that this is the nature of existence, just watch the hungry birds who collect seeds, and despite being hungry those birds drop the seeds into the beaks of their babies. This is the power of the Goddess, her manifestation in nature and everywhere, one who empowers attachments, yet also empowers release, asserts the text. The two men want to know more about this Goddess. The Devi Mahatmya portion of this Purana describes the Goddess with theological and philosophical premises focussed on the feminine.

Socio-cultural content 
The text presents a diverse range of topics including society, religion and mythology. Embedded in its chapters is information on Family, Marriage, Social Life, Dress, Food, Customs, Ceremonies, Weights And Measures, Social Conventions, Position Of Women, Geography, Flora And Fauna known and considered important in ancient Indian society along with Mythology and Theology.

Wendy Doniger states that the Markandeya Purana challenges some of the contextual assumptions about the medieval Indian society in 1st-millennium. She writes, in her analysis of chapters 10 and 11 of the text which discusses its theory of embryo development and wherein the Purana asserts that woman's contribution to the development and the health of a fetus is essential:

Influence 
The Chandi Charitar Ukati Bilas in Dasam Granth – a secondary scripture of Sikhism, state Louis E. Fenech and W. H. McLeod, is sourced from the Markandeya Purana.

The Devi-Mahatmya portion of the text is recited during Durga Puja festival, in Durga temples of India.

See also

Notes

References

Bibliography

External links 
The Markandeya Purana (English) By F. E. Pargiter; Online HTML
Chapters 1-93 Of Markandeya Purana In Sanskrit At Göttingen Register Of Electronic Texts In Indian Languages
The Markandeya Purana, In English, Complete Online At Kamakoti.Org
The Markandeya Purana, In Sanskrit-Hindi

Puranas
Shaktism
Advaita Vedanta